Lukas Okechukwu Nmecha (born 14 December 1998) is a German professional footballer who plays as a forward for Bundesliga club VfL Wolfsburg and the Germany national team. 

Nmecha was born in Hamburg, Germany but relocated to England as a child with his family. He represented his birth country for the first time with the Germany U21 national team, despite being capped by England at the same level.

Club career

Manchester City
During a football tournament at his primary school team in Wythenshawe, he was scouted by Manchester City, where he played for their youth ranks for over a decade, before making his debut on 19 December 2017 in the EFL Cup. On his debut he scored the third penalty for Manchester City in their penalty shootout win over Leicester City.

He made his Premier League debut on 29 April 2018, as a late substitute for Gabriel Jesus against West Ham United at the London Stadium.

He was involved in several games during Manchester City's first team squad for the 2018–19 pre season tour in the U.S. to compete in the 2018 International Champions Cup. He scored his first goal at first team level on 29 July 2018 in the pre season friendly against Bayern Munich in a 3–2 win.

Preston North End (loan)
Nmecha was loaned to Preston North End for the 2018–19 season.

VfL Wolfsburg (loan)
On 3 August 2019, Nmecha joined Bundesliga club VfL Wolfsburg on a season-long loan.

Middlesbrough (loan)
Nmecha's loan was ended on 3 January 2020 and he joined Middlesbrough on loan. His loan expired on 31 July 2020.

Anderlecht (loan)
On 21 August 2020, Nmecha joined former teammate Vincent Kompany's team  Anderlecht on loan. On 13 September 2020, he scored his first goal with Anderlecht in a 2–0 win over Cercle Brugge. On 19 September, he scored a brace in a 4–2 win over Waasland-Beveren. He ended the 2020–21 season scoring 18 goals in 37 matches.

Return to Wolfsburg
Nmecha re-joined VFL Wolfsburg in a permanent deal on 16 July 2021.  He scored the winning goal on his Bundesliga debut for the club, in a come-from-behind 2–1 victory over Hertha Berlin on 21 August.

International career
Born in Hamburg to a German mother and a Nigerian father, but raised in England, Nmecha was eligible to play for Nigeria, Germany and England.

England
In October 2014, Nmecha scored for the England Under-17 team in a qualifier against Macedonia. Nmecha was included in the England under-19 squad for the 2017 UEFA European Under-19 Championship. He scored the only goal of the game in the semi-final against the Czech Republic and also scored the winner in the final against Portugal.

On 18 May 2018, Nmecha received a call up to the England U21 team by Manager Aidy Boothroyd, for the Toulon Tournament. On 9 June 2018, Nmecha came on as a substitute in the 2018 Toulon Tournament final as England defeated Mexico to retain the title. In November 2018, Nmecha scored for the England Under-20 team against Germany.

Germany
In March 2019, Nmecha declared for Germany and was included in their U21 squad for the first time. He made his debut as a 59th minute substitute during the 2–1 victory over England at Bournemouth on 26 March 2019. On 6 June 2021, he scored the only goal in a 1–0 win over Portugal in the 2021 UEFA European Under-21 Championship Final, and finished the competition as top scorer with four goals.

He made his debut for the senior national team on 11 November 2021 in a World Cup qualifier against Liechtenstein.

Personal life
Nmecha is the older brother of fellow player Felix Nmecha and Sarah Nmecha. He is of Igbo Nigerian descent. They were born in Germany before moving to England at a young age.

Style of play
Nmecha's main position is as a centre forward, but he is also able to play as a winger on either side. He is known for being comfortable with both feet and for his first touch and finishing ability. Nmecha described that he also likes to use his pace to run at defenders.

Career statistics

Club

International

Honours
England U19
UEFA European Under-19 Championship: 2017

England U21
Toulon Tournament: 2018

Germany U21
UEFA European Under-21 Championship: 2021

Individual
UEFA European Under-21 Championship Team of The Tournament: 2021

References

External links

Profile at the VfL Wolfsburg website

England profile at The Football Association

1998 births
Living people
Footballers from Hamburg
German footballers
Germany under-21 international footballers
Germany international footballers
English footballers
England youth international footballers
England under-21 international footballers
Association football forwards
German sportspeople of Nigerian descent
English people of Nigerian descent
German emigrants to England
Naturalised citizens of the United Kingdom
Manchester City F.C. players
Preston North End F.C. players
VfL Wolfsburg players
Middlesbrough F.C. players
R.S.C. Anderlecht players
Premier League players
Bundesliga players
English Football League players
Belgian Pro League players
German expatriate footballers
English expatriate footballers
German expatriate sportspeople in Belgium
English expatriates in Belgium
Expatriate footballers in Belgium
English people of German descent